Joseph Stewart (January 29, 1822 – April 23, 1904) was an officer in the United States Army notable for serving as commander of Fort Alcatraz, Fort Churchill and the Department of Alaska.  His name is occasionally seen as Jasper Stewart.

Biography

Early life
Joseph Stewart was born in Columbia, Kentucky on January 29, 1822, and graduated from the U.S. Military Academy at West Point in 1842. He served as a 2nd Lieutenant in the 1st U.S. Artillery and later the 3rd U.S. Artillery during the Mexican War.  On January 3, 1856 he was promoted captain of Company H in the 3rd Artillery.  In December 1859 Captain Stewart took command of Fort Alcatraz.  In the years immediately preceding the Civil War, Stewart transformed the fort into the most powerful coastal defense in the west. It was also during Stewart's time on Alcatraz that it took on the role of a prison for the first time.  11 soldiers under Stewart's command were imprisoned there and soon other nearby forts were sending prisoners there too.

Pyramid Lake War
In 1860 a vigilante force was soundly defeated by Paiute Indians in a battle near Pyramid Lake in present-day Nevada.  This defeat prompted the Federal government to dispatch a contingent of the U.S. Army to the area.  Captain Stewart took command of the so-called "Carson Valley Expedition" composed of 200 regular army soldiers from the 3rd Artillery and 6th U.S. Infantry.  Stewart was, however, subordinated to Col. John C. Hays who was in command of a regiment of U.S. Volunteers.  Hays and Stewart defeated the Paiutes in the second Battle of Pyramid Lake.

Fort Churchill
While Hays' volunteers disbanded shortly after the battle, Stewart's regulars remained in the area for some time.  Stewart was ordered to construct a permanent army post in the area.  Eventually, he chose a site along the Carson River which he suggested should be named in honor of General Sylvester Churchill.  The U.S. Army confirmed the site and name in August and construction of Fort Churchill began.  Construction was completed in 1861 with Stewart as the post's first commander.

Civil War
During the American Civil War Stewart briefly returned to command Fort Alcatraz.  In 1861 he was transferred to the defenses of Washington, DC and commanded the artillery in George A. McCall's division of the Army of the Potomac from December 1861 to February 1862.  From April to October 1862 he served as recruiting officer for San Francisco and was the Inspector General of the Humboldt Military District during the Winter of 1862/1863.  He was chief of artillery for the Department of the Pacific from April to July 1863 and ended the war as recruiting officer for Salem MA from November to December 1865.  On December 11, 1865, Stewart was promoted Major in the 4th U.S. Artillery.

Post Civil War
Following the Civil War, Stewart commanded various forts along the eastern United States including Fort McHenry and Fort Macon. He served as the fifth commander of the Department of Alaska, from January 4, 1873 to April 20, 1874, then returned to California in command of the Presidio of San Francisco from May 8 to June 17, 1875.  From 1876-1879 Stewart was in command of Fort Canby engaged against Native Americans during the Bannock War.  On July 18, 1879, Stewart was promoted Lieutenant Colonel of the 3rd U.S. Artillery.  He retired on August 25, 1879 and died in Berkeley, CA on April 23, 1904.

He is buried at San Francisco National Cemetery in the Presidio.

See also
List of governors of Alaska

References

External links
 

Commanders of the Department of Alaska
1822 births
1904 deaths
Burials in California
People from Adair County, Kentucky
United States Military Academy alumni
People of Kentucky in the American Civil War
Alcatraz Island